Vampires, also known as Abandon, is a 1986 horror film directed by Len Anthony and starring Duane Jones, John Bly, Jackie James, Orly Benyar, Kit Jones, and Robin Michaels; it was the final film of Duane Jones. The cinematographer was Ernest Dickerson, who later worked with Spike Lee and directed some episodes of horror TV show The Walking Dead.

The plot concerns mysterious events at a private girls' school in which the students' life-energy is drained by a mad scientist's machine. Subsequently the film was retitled Abandon and included in a double bill on VHS with Anthony's later film Fright House, under the title of the latter movie. It was released on DVD in 2016.

Plot

Cast

Critical reception
HorrorNews.net called it "completely and utterly forgettable". ComingSoon.net were equally critical, calling it a "bizarre, barely watchable direct-to-video mess".

References

External links 

 

1986 films
1986 horror films
American vampire films
1980s English-language films
1980s American films